Miss United States 1960, also referred to as Miss World USA 1960, was the 3rd edition of the Miss United States World pageant, was held in Bridgeport, Connecticut. 

It was originally won by Annette Driggers of New York City, NY, who was crowned by the outgoing titleholder, Loretta Powell of Connecticut, but it was discovered Driggers was only 15 years old, while having claimed she was 20. As this meant she did not meet the age requirements of Miss World, she was disqualified, being replaced with the 1st Runner-Up, Judith Ann Achter of Missouri. Achter went on to represent the United States at the Miss World 1960 Pageant in London later that year. She finished as 4th Runner-Up at Miss World.

Results

Placements

∞ Annette Driggers had originally won Miss United States 1960, but she was disqualified from Miss World due to being underage. Due to protocol, the 1st Runner-Up, Judith Achter, became Miss United States World 1960 and competed at Miss World 1960.

Special awards

Delegates
The Miss United States World 1960 delegates were:

 Alabama - Margaret Jo Gordon
 Baltimore, MD - Diane White 
 Beverly Hills, CA - Gail Shapiro
 California - Gail Stevens
 Chicago, IL - Susan Engel
 Cincinnati, OH - Darlene DiPasquale
 Connecticut - Gloria Adshade
 Delaware - Gail Porter
 District of Columbia - Sue Sherman
 Florida - Unknown
 Illinois - Sharon Woods
 Kentucky - Louise King
 Maryland - Carolyn Clark
 Massachusetts - Beatrice "Bea" Duprey 
 Missouri - Judith Ann Achter
 New Hampshire - Nancy Gray
 New York - Arlene Nesbitt
 New York City, NY - Annette Driggers
 North Carolina - Rita Souther
 Ohio - Barbara Stagge
 Pennsylvania - Caroline Brice
 Rhode Island - Donna Dickson
 South Carolina - Dianne Taff
 St. Louis, MO - Cheri Schear
 Tennessee - Martha Lee Adams
 Texas - Susan Jan Seibert 
 Virginia - Patricia Buck
 West Virginia - Zora Krmeta

Notes

Did not Compete

Crossovers
Contestants who competed in other beauty pageants:

Miss USA
1960: : Margaret Jo Gordon (2nd Runner-Up)

References

External links
Miss World Official Website
Miss World America Official Website

1960 in the United States
World America
1960
1960 in Connecticut